Pure Software was founded in October 1991 by Reed Hastings, Raymond Peck and Mark Box.  The original product was a debugging tool for UNIX software applications written in C called Purify.  After adding new products such as Quantify and PureLink, and doubling its revenue every year for four years, Pure Software went public with the help of Morgan Stanley in August 1995.  In August 1996, Pure Software merged with Atria Software to form Pure Atria  Corporation.  Later in August 1997, Rational Software acquired Pure Atria, giving Hastings the capital to start Netflix.

When Pure Atria was acquired by Rational Software, it triggered a 42% drop in both companies' stocks after the deal was announced. Hastings was appointed Chief Technical Officer of the combined companies and left soon after the acquisition. "I had the great fortune of doing a mediocre job at my first company," says Hastings. "We got more bureaucratic as we grew." After Pure Software, Hastings spent two years thinking about how to avoid similar problems at his next startup, Netflix.

Notes

Defunct software companies of the United States